The 2021–22 Texas Tech Lady Raiders basketball team represented Texas Tech University in the 2021–22 NCAA Division I women's basketball season. The Lady Raiders were led by second year head coach Krista Gerlich. They played their homes games at United Supermarkets Arena and competed as members of the Big 12 Conference.

Previous season 

The Lady Raiders finished the season 10-15, 5-13 in Big 12 play to finish in seventh place. They lost to Kansas State in the Big 12 Tournament. They were not invited to the NCAA tournament or the WNIT.

Roster

Schedule

Source:

|-
!colspan=6 style=| Regular season

|-
!colspan=12 style=| Big 12 Women's Tournament

Rankings

The Coaches Poll did not release a Week 2 poll and the AP Poll did not release a poll after the NCAA Tournament.

See also
2021–22 Texas Tech Red Raiders basketball team

References

Texas Tech Lady Raiders basketball seasons
Texas Tech
Texas Tech
Texas Tech